The European Union – Latin America and Caribbean Foundation (EU–LAC Foundation) is an international organisation created in 2010 by the Heads of State and Government of the European Union (EU), Latin America and Caribbean (LAC) with the mission of strengthening and promoting the strategic partnership between both regions, improving its visibility and encouraging the participation of the respective civil societies.

Established in 2011 in Hamburg, Germany, where it is based, the Foundation is a tool for bi-regional relations. Its activities are aimed at nurturing intergovernmental dialogue, in particular in seven strategic thematic areas: Higher Education; Science, Technology and Innovation; Sustainable, Resilient and Inclusive Economy; Climate Change; Culture; Multilateralism and Bi-Regional Association; and Gender. However, other themes such as youth and the fulfilment of the Sustainable Development Goals (SDGs) are transversal axes for all its lines of action, which allows the Foundation to be a key actor in the deepening and dynamization of the bi-regional strategic association. The Foundation has 61 members: 33 member states from Latin America and the Caribbean, 27 Member States of the European Union, and the European Union itself through its institutions.

History 
During the fifth European Union, Latin America and the Caribbean Summit (EU–LAC Summit), held in Lima, Peru, on 16 May 2008, the initiative towards the creation of a bi-regional organisation was launched by the Heads of State and Government of LAC and the EU.

At the sixth EU–LAC Summit, held in Madrid, Spain, on 18 May 2010, the decision on the creation of the EU–LAC Foundation was launched by the Heads of State and Government of the EU and LAC, the President of the European Council and the President of the European Commission. The Foundation was created as a tool for strengthening the bi-regional partnership and as a means of stimulating debate on common strategies and actions.

The EU-LAC Foundation formally started its work on 7 November 2011 with a transitional foundation status under German civil law. It is based in the Free and Hanseatic City of Hamburg, Germany.

The agreement establishing the EU–LAC Foundation as an international organisation with legal personality under public international law was opened for signature during the CELAC and EU Foreign Ministers Meeting in Santo Domingo, the Dominican Republic on 25 October 2016 and entered into force on 17 May 2019.

Members 
The Foundation consists of 61 members: 33 member states from Latin America and the Caribbean, 27 member states from the European Union, and the EU itself through its institutions.

Since 2010, the Community of Latin American and Caribbean States (CELAC) is the EU's counterpart in the bi-regional partnership process. The CELAC is composed of the 33 countries of Latin America and the Caribbean.

Complete list of the members of the EU–LAC Foundation:

Latin American and Caribbean Members

EU Members States

Objectives and Activities 
The objectives of the foundation are:

 Contribute to the strengthening of the CELAC-EU bi-regional partnership process involving participation and inputs of civil society and other social actors;
 Encourage further mutual knowledge and understanding between both regions;
 Enhance the mutual visibility between both regions, as well as of the bi-regional partnership itself.

To meet its objectives, the EU–LAC Foundation develops several initiatives in the following thematic areas:

1. Higher Education

The EU-LAC Foundation contributes to creating spaces for dialogue and knowledge management to build the Common Area of Higher Education between the European Union, Latin America and the Caribbean, as well as to facilitate the participation and contributions of civil society, including the academic sector to bi-regional cooperation and dialogue.

2. Science, Technology and Innovation

In the area of Science, Technology and Innovation, priority is given to strengthening the linking of agendas and dialogue between governmental, non-governmental and academic stakeholders around the implementation of the Joint Initiative on Research and Innovation (JIRI).

3. Economic and Social Development 

Within this theme, the EU-LAC Foundation develops a set of activities that address current economic and social problems and long-term trends affecting LAC and EU societies with a view to ensuring a robust recovery and building more innovative, inclusive, and resilient economies and societies. The Foundation aims to do this by (1) promoting bi-regional dialogue platforms with public and private actors to strengthen economic and business relations, (2) generating knowledge and promoting exchange on social cohesion and inclusion, and (3) promoting bi-regional digital partnerships.

4. Climate Change

Climate change is one of the priorities mentioned in the III. EU-CELAC Summit, as well as in Chapter 2 of the Bi-regional Action Plan. The EU-LAC Foundation promotes meeting spaces for dialogue and reflection with non-governmental actors of reference to enrich and strengthen the intergovernmental process that seeks solutions to the challenges societies face in both regions.

5. Culture

Culture is a fundamental instrument for the rapprochement between the countries of the European Union, Latin America and the Caribbean. The EU-LAC Foundation's activities in this strategic area are designed to contribute to greater knowledge and mutual understanding between our societies and to strengthen bi-regional cooperation. It also seeks to contribute to SDG 17 to "revitalize the global partnership for sustainable development".

6. Multilateralism and Bi-regional Association 

In order to jointly address current international developments and new global challenges, the EU-LAC Foundation meets with key partners to review the advantages and potential of the EU-CELAC bi-regional strategic partnership. The Foundation promotes multilateralism as the viable architecture, from a perspective of shared values, problems, and solutions within bi-regional relations.

7. Gender

In chapter 7 of the 2015 EU-CELAC Action Plan, EU and Latin American and Caribbean authorities expressed their full commitment to work in favour of women, the reduction of inequalities, especially in terms of their access to economic and political rights, and the elimination of violence. The EU-LAC Foundation thus aims to share concrete experiences and knowledge among the members of the EU-LAC Women's International Network in order to advance the discussion on these issues.

Structure 
The structure of the foundation comprises the Board of Governors, the President, and the Executive Director.

Board of Governors 
The EU–LAC Foundation's Board of Governors oversees the management of the Foundation and ensures that the Foundation works towards its goals.

The Board of Governors has 61 members representing each of the members of the EU–LAC Foundation. The Board of Governors meets at least twice a year and is co-chaired by the CELAC and EU presidencies.

President 
Every four years, the Board of Governors selects an ad-honorem President, who has mainly representation functions. The President's office alternates between a national of an EU member state and a national of a Latin American or Caribbean state. If the appointed President comes from an EU member state, the Executive Director must be a citizen of a Latin American or Caribbean state and vice versa.

 2011–2015: Dr Benita Ferrero-Waldner, (Austria), former Minister of Foreign Affairs of Austria and former EU Commissioner for Foreign Affairs and Neighbourhood, and Trade
 2016–2020: Dr Leonel Fernández, (Dominican Republic), former President of the Dominican Republic and President of the Global Democracy and Development Foundation (FUNGLODE)
 2020–2024: Leire Pajín Iraola, (Spain), former Minister of Health, Social Services and Equality and Director of International Development at IS Global

Executive Director 
The Executive Director is the legal representative of the EU–LAC Foundation. The Executive Director is elected by the Board of Governors every four years, based on the recommendation of the regional group that holds the position of Executive Director for that period. If the selected Executive Director is from an EU member state, the selected President must be a citizen of a Latin American or Caribbean state and vice versa.

 2011–2015: Jorge Valdez Carrillo, (Peru), former Ambassador of the Peruvian Diplomatic Service
 2016–2020: Dr Paola Amadei, (Italy), Ambassador of the European Union to the Kingdom of Lesotho
 since July 2020: Dr Adrián Bonilla (Ecuador), former National Secretary of Higher Education

Financing 
The EU–LAC Foundation is funded by voluntary contributions from its members.

See also 
EU–LAC Summit (European Union, Latin America and the Caribbean Summit)
Latin America and Caribbean

References

External links 
The Constitutive Agreement establishing the EU–LAC Foundation
Official website of the European Union, Latin America and the Caribbean Foundation
 Madrid Declaration establishing the creation of the Foundation (§ 34)
 Information from the Free and Hanseatic City of Hamburg on the EU–LAC Foundation (in German)
 The EU's Relations with Latin America and the Caribbean, Federal Foreign Office of Germany
 The EU and Latin America and the Caribbean: towards a stronger partnership? , European Parliament, Policy Department for External Relations, 2020, doi:10.2861/658924.

Organisations based in Hamburg
Intergovernmental organizations established by treaty
Political conferences
Political and economic think tanks based in Germany